Philippe Omnès (born 6 August 1960) is a French fencer and Olympic champion in the foil competition.

He won a gold medal in individual foil event at the 1992 Summer Olympics in Barcelona.

References

External links

1960 births
Living people
French male foil fencers
Olympic fencers of France
Fencers at the 1984 Summer Olympics
Fencers at the 1988 Summer Olympics
Fencers at the 1992 Summer Olympics
Fencers at the 1996 Summer Olympics
Olympic gold medalists for France
Olympic bronze medalists for France
Olympic medalists in fencing
Fencers from Paris
Medalists at the 1984 Summer Olympics
Medalists at the 1992 Summer Olympics